The discography of Why Don't We, an American boy band consisting of Zach Herron, Jack Avery, Daniel Seavey, Corbyn Besson, and Jonah Marais. They have released two studio albums, six extended plays, sixteen music videos, twenty-six singles (including one as featured artist), and three promotional singles.

Albums

Extended plays

Singles

As lead artist

As featured artist

Promotional singles

Other charted songs

Music videos

Notes

References

Discographies of American artists